Petr Kůrka (born 24 October 1960) is a Czech former sports shooter. He competed at the 1988 Summer Olympics, the 1992 Summer Olympics and the 1996 Summer Olympics.

References

External links
 

1960 births
Living people
Czech male sport shooters
Olympic shooters of Czechoslovakia
Olympic shooters of the Czech Republic
Shooters at the 1988 Summer Olympics
Shooters at the 1992 Summer Olympics
Shooters at the 1996 Summer Olympics
People from Teplice nad Bečvou
Sportspeople from the Olomouc Region